Gwangju National Museum is a national museum located in Gwangju, South Korea. The museum opened in 1978.

See also
List of museums in South Korea

References

External links
 Gwangju National Museum Official site 

National museums of South Korea
Museums in Gwangju